Alören can refer to:

 Alören, Gümüşhacıköy
 Alören, Mecitözü